Events in the year 2017 in Austria.

Incumbents
 President: Alexander Van der Bellen
 Chancellor: Christian Kern (until 18 December), Sebastian Kurz (since 18 December)

Governors
 Burgenland: Hans Niessl 
 Carinthia: Peter Kaiser
 Lower Austria: Erwin Pröll (until 19 April); Johanna Mikl-Leitner (from 19 April)
 Salzburg: Wilfried Haslauer Jr.
 Styria: Hermann Schützenhöfer
 Tyrol: Günther Platter
 Upper Austria: Josef Pühringer (until 5 April); Thomas Stelzer (from 5 April)
 Vienna: Michael Häupl 
 Vorarlberg: Markus Wallner

Events

15 October – Austrian legislative election, 2017
18 December – The First Kurz government is formed.
18 March to 26 March – The 2017 Special Olympics World Winter Games are held in  Graz and Schladming, Austria .
2 July to 6 July – The 2017 Tour of Austria is held.
 October -  a legal ban on face-covering Islamic clothing was adopted by the Austrian parliament.

Deaths

15 January – Erwin Obermair, amateur astronomer (b. 1946).
23 February -  Sabine Oberhauser, politician (b. 1963).

1 June – Alois Mock, politician (b. 1934)

References

 
2010s in Austria
Years of the 21st century in Austria
Austria
Austria